Ophiclinops hutchinsi, the Earspot snakeblenny, is a species of clinid native to reefs with seagrass or weed growth at depths of from  along the coast of south east Western Australia.

Etymology
The specific epithet "hutchinsi" honours J. Barry Hutchins, whom the authors credit with collecting the type specimens for the species.

Description
This species can reach a maximum length of  TL. They are primarily a mottled brown in colouring.

References

hutchinsi
Fish described in 1980
Taxa named by Victor G. Springer